Lot Chiwunga (born 6 December 1986) is a Zimbabwean footballer who plays as a forward for Zimbabwe Premier Soccer League side Black Rhinos and the Zimbabwe national team.

Career

Club
Chiwunga started in the youth set-up of Dynamos before moving into senior football with Kambuzuma United. His stay with Kambuzuma was short as he soon left to join Windsor and then Douglas Warriors. He won promotion with Douglas Warriors in 2009. He remained with the latter for four years before joining second division club Black Rhinos and again won promotion, this time in 2012.

International
He has won 2 caps for the Zimbabwe national team. His first call-up came for the 2013 COSAFA Cup in Zambia, he missed a spot-kick in Zimbabwe's quarter-final win over Malawi in a penalty shoot-out. His other cap for his nation came in the final of the aforementioned competition. He was selected in Ian Gorowa's provisional squad for the 2014 African Nations Championship but was overlooked when the final squad was confirmed.

Career statistics
.

References

Living people
Zimbabwean footballers
1986 births
Sportspeople from Kadoma, Zimbabwe
Association football forwards
Zimbabwe international footballers